Sweden  competed at the 2019 World Aquatics Championships in Gwangju, South Korea from 12 to 28 July.

Medalists

Diving

Sweden entered four divers.

Men

Women

Mixed

Open water swimming

Sweden qualified two male open water swimmers.

Men

Swimming

Sweden entered seven swimmers.

Men

Women

 Legend: (*) = Swimmers who participated in the heat only.

References

World Aquatics Championship
Nations at the 2019 World Aquatics Championships
2019